Christian Dupont-Roc (born in Megève, Haute-Savoie, France) is a French and Dutch curler.

Teams

France

Netherlands

References

External links

 CHRISTIAN DUPONT-ROC : Ski Instructor ESF Megève
 

Living people
Sportspeople from Haute-Savoie
French male curlers

Dutch male curlers
Year of birth missing (living people)